Colonel Obedience Robbins (sometimes given as Robins) (April 26, 1600December 30, 1662) was a Burgess six times in Virginia during the 17th century.

Family
Obedience Robins was born in 1600 to Richard Robins and Dorothy Goodman.  In 1634, Robbins married Grace Neale Waters in Virginia. Their son John was born on May 7, 1636 in Northampton Co., Virginia.  His daughter Mary Robins married Captain John Savage, whose father Thomas Savage was an interpreter of Indian languages at Jamestown.

Biography
Robbins was born shortly before April 26, 1600 in Long Buckby, Northamptonshire, England. He emigrated to the Virginia Colony in 1628. Robbins represented Accomack Co., Virginia as a Burgess in 1630 and was appointed a justice of Accomack Co., in 1632. He also served several more times as a member of the Virginia House of Burgesses, in 1639, 1642, 1644, and twice in 1652 in April and November. He also was a member of the Council.

During his years in Virginia he was an ardent foe of Colonel Edmund Scarborough. He was instrumental in getting Northampton Co., Virginia named. After Robbins' death Scarborough wanted the county divided.

Death

Robbins died around December 30, 1662 in Northampton Co., Virginia.

Ancestry

References

House of Burgesses members
1600s births
1662 deaths
People from Long Buckby
Virginia colonial people
English emigrants
People from Accomack County, Virginia